Oststeinbek is a municipality in the district of Stormarn, in Schleswig-Holstein, Germany. It is situated approximately 13 kilometres east of the center of Hamburg, directly on the border between Hamburg and Schleswig-Holstein.

First mentioned in 1254 it celebrated its 750th anniversary in 2004.

As of 2011, Oststeinbek had about 8600 inhabitants.

References

External links
Homepage of Oststeinbek

Stormarn (district)